The London Municipal Reform League was a pressure group operating in the Metropolitan Board of Works, formed in 1881 by John Lloyd, having a Liberal Party outlook. Its president from 1882 was Joseph Firth Bottomley Firth.

See also
 London Municipal Society
 Municipal Reform Party
 Arthur Hobhouse, 1st Baron Hobhouse

References
Reforming London: The London Government Problem, 1855-1900 By John Davis.

Defunct organisations based in London
Organizations established in 1881
1881 establishments in England
Liberal Party (UK)
Political organisations based in London
Defunct political organisations based in the United Kingdom